Ernst Friedrich Lindner  LL. D. (1 May 1897 – 4 November 1988) was an Austrian-born Canadian painter. He moved to Saskatoon, Saskatchewan, in 1926, where became a self-taught commercial artist. He soon was recognized locally and then nationally and was active in several art organizations. He is known for his meticulous watercolors of natural woodlands depicting the cycle of decay and regeneration.

Early years
Ernst Friedrich Lindner was born on 1 May 1897 in Vienna, Austria.
He was the thirteenth child of a German family. His father Karl Oswald Lindner (1844-1919)  ran a business that made stylish canes and parasol handles, and employed almost 300 craftsmen.
Ernst caught diphtheria as a child of seven, and drew and painted during his long convalescence.
During World War I (1914–1918) Lindner volunteered in 1915 to join a mountaineer regiment of the Austrian army. 
He was wounded, but recovered and was back in service before the end of the war.
After the war he worked as a bank clerk in Innsbruck, Austria.
He also helped in the family firm  and engaged in a mineral water and sugar confectionery company with his brother Paul that failed. 

1921 he married Hertha Liebenberger. One year later, their only son Herbert (1922-1995) was born. In order to collect money for his trip to Canada, he obtained expensive cameras per delivery note and cashed them in a pawn shop. His siblings had to buy the cameras back and return them to the camera shop. From the train window of a train departing to London, he informed his wife Hertha that he would not return. He boarded the ship "Melitta" from Antwerp to Canada, where he arrived with only $5 in his pocket.

Artistic career

In 1926 Lindner immigrated to Canada and settled in Saskatoon, Saskatchewan.
At first Lindner found work as a farm laborer.
He attended night classes at the University of Saskatchewan under Augustus Kenderdine.
He became a freelance commercial artist and illustrator, largely self-taught.
He had become recognized as an artist in Saskatchewan by 1931, and by 1933 was starting to exhibit in eastern Canada.
Lindner began to teach at the Saskatoon Technical Collegiate in 1931, first giving a night course and then became a full-time instructor.
He headed the Art Department at the Collegiate from 1936 until 1962.

Lindner was very active in the arts community.
He started a weekly discussion group called "Saturday Nights" that met in the private homes of local artists, often in his own home.
He was a member of the Prospectors, the first society of professional artists in the province.
He became president of the Saskatoon Art Association.
When the Federation of Canadian Artists was formed in 1941 Lindner was made responsible for the Saskatchewan region.
He was one of the first members of the Saskatchewan Arts Board.

It was through the influence of Lindner and Kenderdine that the University of Saskatchewan began to run its annual Emma Lake Artist's Workshops.
Lindner participated in these workshops in 1955–57, 1960–64 and 1966.
Some of the prominent Modernist painters of New York were guests at the Emma Lake Workshops in the late 1950s and early 1960s, and influenced Lindner's style.
The formalist Jules Olitski, known for his color-field abstractions, was a significant influence.
In 1959 Lindner returned to Vienna and attended the Akademie der Angewandten Kunst, where he took a master's course in etching and stone lithography.

In 1962 Lindner left the Technical Collegiate and devoted himself to art for the remainder of his life. 
Ernest Lindner died in Saskatoon on 4 November 1988, aged 91.
The Ernest Lindner Park is the Erindale suburb of Saskatoon in named in his honor.

Work

Lindner is known for his many watercolors inspired by the natural beauty of the wooded country around his summer home at Emma Lake.
He also made etchings, lithographs, linocuts and wood block prints.
Lindner has been called a Late Modernist and also a Magic Realist.
Lindner depicted the forest floor from close quarters, with highly textured patterns of surface detail from the fallen branches, tree stumps, moss and lichen.
His work reveals a fascination with the natural cycle of decay and regeneration.
His watercolors of the tangled forest interior were sharply focused, highly keyed and executed with great skill.
In his later work human and plant forms often overlap and blend into each other.
Clement Greenberg conducted an Emma Lake Artists' Workshop in 1962 in which Lindner participated. Greenberg wrote in an introduction to an exhibition of Linder's work in Regina in 1962–63,

Lindner's work was widely exhibited in Canada and was also shown at the Canada House Gallery in London, England, and the Canadian Cultural centers in Paris and Brussels.
His work is held in many important public or private collections.
Examples are held in the National Gallery of Canada in Ottawa, the Glenbow Museum in Calgary and the Winnipeg Art Gallery.
The University of Saskatchewan gave him an honorary Doctor of Laws degree in 1972.
He was elected a member of the Royal Canadian Academy of Arts in 1977.
In 1979 he was made an Officer of the Order of Canada.

Studio

Lindner visited Emma Lake in the summer of 1935 and stayed at Murray point, the site of the University art school camp and later the location of the Emma Lake Artists’ Workshops. Just across the lake Lindner and his wife Bodil found a densely wooded uninhabited island that they called Fairy Island.
Lindner built a studio and summer cottage on the northeast shore of the island on what is now called Lindner Point.
The studio was a spruce log cabin. A large corner window facing northwest gave natural light. Lindner often sat there to paint views of the landscape.
Lindner  sold the property to the University of Saskatchewan in 1961. It has since been used as a base of researchers into the local botany, zoology and limnology.
From April 2007 the studio, surrounded by a  mixed wood forest, has been recognized as a Provincial Heritage Property.

Personal life 
His first marriage in Austria with Hertha Liebenberger lasted from 1921 to 1936. Neither she nor their son Herbert (1922-1995) wanted to come to Canada on Lindner's several invitations.

1937 he married his student Bodil Brostrom von Degen (born 1911 in Denmark)  and had a daughter Degen, born in 1943. They divorced in 1952. During his stay in Vienna 1959 he was accompanied by his daughter Degen.

He was not interested in his two grandsons Michael and Andreas (from his son Herbert) and declined their wish to visit him in Saskatoon in the 1970s. His daughter Degen has two children, his grandchildren.

References

Sources

External links 
 Ernst Friedrich Lindner in the Vienna History Wiki
 Mr. Ernst Lindner via The Governor General of Canada website.

1897 births
1988 deaths
Artists from Saskatoon
Artists from Vienna
Officers of the Order of Canada
20th-century Canadian painters
Canadian male painters
20th-century Canadian male artists
Austrian emigrants to Canada
Members of the Royal Canadian Academy of Arts